The 1978 Porsche Tennis Grand Prix was a women's singles tennis tournament played on indoor carpet courts at the Tennis Sporthalle Filderstadt in Filderstadt in West Germany. The event was part of the A category of the 1978 Colgate Series. It was the inaugural edition of the tournament and was held from 23 October through 29 October 1978. First-seeded Tracy Austin won the singles title, her first as a professional, and earned $6,000 first-prize money as well as a Porsche 924.

Finals

Singles
 Tracy Austin defeated  Betty Stöve 6–3, 6–3
 It was Austin's 1st singles title of the year and the 2nd of her career.

Doubles
 Tracy Austin /  Betty Stöve defeated  Mima Jaušovec /  Virginia Ruzici 6–3, 6–2

Prize money

Notes

References

External links
 
 WTA tournament profile
 ITF tournament event details
 WTA tournament event details

Porsche Tennis Grand Prix
1978 in German tennis
Porsche Tennis Grand Prix
1970s in Baden-Württemberg
Porsch